Brian Arthur Sellick (1918–1996) was a British anaesthetist. He was known for  cricoid pressure, he described in 1961. This manoeuvre is named after him.

Sellick worked as an anaesthetist at Middlesex Hospital. There he demonstrated the efficacy of his invention using a cadaver with full stomach placed in the Trendelenburg position.

See also
Cricoid pressure
Rapid sequence induction

References

1918 births
1996 deaths
British anaesthetists